The Manchester Schoolhouse, at 19750 California State Route 1 in Manchester, California, was built in 1907, the year after the 1906 San Francisco earthquake.  It was listed on the National Register of Historic Places in 1979.

It served as a school and also as a meeting hall for the city.

It was deemed "significant as the only public building in Manchester surviving from the days when coastal logging was a prolific and flourishing industry. The school's design is notable as an outstanding example of North Coast school architecture and for its inclusion of a community/use/school use meeting room."

References

Schools in California
National Register of Historic Places in Mendocino County, California
Buildings and structures completed in 1907